Ameria may refer to:

 Amelia, Umbria
 Site of a temple near Cabira, Pontus
 Ameriabank an Armenian bank
 Ameria invaria a moth
 Mahathala ameria a butterfly